Yuri Konstantinovich Terapiano (21 [o.s. 9] October 1892 – 3 July 1980) was a Russian poet, writer, translator, literary critic and a prominent figure in White émigré cultural life.

Biography
Yuri Terapiano graduated from the Alexandrovskaya Classical High School in 1911, and then from the Saint Vladimir University Law School in Kiev in 1916. Afterwards, he was drafted into the Imperial Russian Army to fight on the Southeastern front during World War I. In 1919 he joined the Volunteer Army.

His early works were published in various Kiev literary journals. In 1924, after his emigration to France, he organized and chaired the Union of Young Poets and Prose Writers in Paris. In 1955 he became the head of the literary criticism section of the Paris magazine Russian Thought (Русская Мысль). Terapiano published six books of poetry but became known mostly for his collection of memoirs and articles Meetings (Встречи, 1953), and the Russian émigré anthology The Muse of Diaspora (Муза диаспоры, 1960). He also published a novella Voyage to an Unknown Country: Eastern Legends (Paris - 1946).

Literary work
Terapiano's poetry shows the influence of the Acmeist school, though formally he wasn't a member of the circle. He aspired toward "simplicity in his artistic method, self-awareness, moderation and purity of expression, and an intense search for God," according to critic Konstantin Mochulsky. Terapiano's subjects included Russia, The Crimea, the Russian Civil War, his own war experiences, daily émigré life in Paris, and his exploration of religious issues and questions.

English translations
Poems, from A Russian Cultural Revival, University of Tennessee Press, 1981.

References

External links 
 Yuri Terapiano's poetry
 Good Things' Anthologist. - Yevgeny Yevtushenko. Ten Centuries of Russian Poetry.

1892 births
1980 deaths
People from Kerch
People from Taurida Governorate
Russian male poets
Russian male short story writers
Russian literary critics
Russian exiles
Russian memoirists
20th-century Russian poets
20th-century Russian translators
20th-century Russian short story writers
20th-century Russian male writers
20th-century memoirists